Wishville is the fifth and final studio album by English alternative rock band Catherine Wheel, released 23 May 2000 by Columbia Records. It was the band's only album not to feature bassist Dave Hawes, who was fired prior to its recording. Without a permanent bassist, the band focused on guitar-centered hard rock arrangements. The album's single was "Sparks Are Gonna Fly".

Release 
Wishville was also released in a deluxe edition featuring special packaging and a second CD of live recordings, recorded live 11 July 2000 in New York.

Reception 

Wishville has received a mixed-to-negative reaction from critics.

A negative review came from AllMusic, which wrote: "You'd be hard pressed to get the Catherine Wheel of 1992 or even 1997 to do more than sneeze at the majority of the album. Most of these songs wouldn't have seen the mixing process at any earlier point in their career. [...] Though the record contains some of the most spartan arrangements the band has composed, much of it seems forced and awkward. The lyrics are no help, containing Rob Dickinson's weakest songwriting." Pitchforks review was highly negative, describing it as "absolutely terrible, a total abomination".

Track listing

"Sparks Are Gonna Fly" – 4:16
"Gasoline" – 4:22
"Lifeline" – 4:29
"What We Want to Believe In" – 4:50
"All of That" – 4:40
"Idle Life" – 4:26
"Mad Dog" – 4:04
"Ballad of a Running Man" – 4:50
"Crème Caramel" – 4:32Deluxe edition bonus disc"Lifeline"– 4:56
"Crank"– 3:37
"Fripp"– 7:22
"Ma Solituda" (with Andrew Montgomery of Geneva on Vocals)– 5:45
"Heal"– 7:21
"Future Boy"– 7:40
"Intravenous"/"Little Muscle"– 8:00

 Singles 
 "Gasoline" US promo CD single
 "Gasoline" – 4:22
 "Sparks Are Gonna Fly"'
 UK promo CD single
 "Sparks Are Gonna Fly" (Radio Edit) – 3:44
 "Sparks Are Gonna Fly" (Danny Saber Remix) – 4:33
 US promo CD single with tracks from previous albums
 "Sparks Are Gonna Fly" (Album Edit) – 3:47
 "Sparks Are Gonna Fly" (Radio Edit) – 3:43
 "Delicious" – 4:15
 "Judy Staring at the Sun" – 3:57
 "Waydown" – 3:14
 "Crank" – 3:46
 "Black Metallic" – 7:18

Personnel

Musicians
Rob Dickinson – vocals, guitar, bass
Brian Futter – guitar, bass, vocals
Neil Sims – bass, percussion, drums, loops, vocals
Tim Friese-Greene – organ, piano
Sara Lee – vocals

Production
Rob Dickinson – producer
Jason Corsaro – engineer
Mike Shipley – mixing
Storm Thorgerson – cover art
Peter Curzon – cover art
Stephen Stickler – photography
Rupert Truman – photography

References

External links 

 

2000 albums
Catherine Wheel albums
Albums with cover art by Storm Thorgerson
Columbia Records albums
Albums produced by Tim Friese-Greene